Fresh Kid Uganda (real name; Patrick Sennyonjo) is a Ugandan rapper, musician and artist.

Music career 
Manager Francis claims to have found Fresh Kid in a rural village miming some songs, brought him to the city and started to nurture his music career and to study too. Manager Francis as the Manager was paying Fresh Kid's school fees  until he got a bursary from Rajiv Ruparelia to study at Kampala Parents School l, Manager Francis signed Fresh Kid under De Texas Entertainment. Fresh Kid's parents fell out with Manager Francis over alleged failure to respect the contractual duties which made Fresh Kid to move from De Texas Entertainment to MC Events.

Songs 

 Victim
 Good Citizen
 Kyogereko
 Tip Tap
 Sibilimu
 Bambi
 Bamuzeeyi Mukulu
 Banteeka

Controversies 
The Ugandan  Minister of State for Youth and Children Affairs Florence Nakiwala Kiyingi  warned Fresh Kid from performing during school hours since according to Ugandan Labour Law  ‘’no-one under 18 should work’’. 
                  
Uganda’s constitution Article 59 clause 56 line 8 restricts young children below 18 from being used for any financial benefits.

Nakiwala stated that Fresh Kid would be taken to Juvenile prison if he disobeyed this law.

See also 

 List of Ugandan musicians

External references
 Fresh Kid UG Biography
 Fresh Kid on Profile Ability
 Fresh Kid UG at Howwebiz

References 

2012 births
Ugandan rappers
Living people
21st-century Ugandan male singers
Child singers